Super Mouse is an arcade video game released by Taito in 1982. It uses the same hardware as Taito's earlier arcade game Round-Up.

Gameplay

The player controls a mouse collecting a stash of food that is scattered around the house. Opposing the mouse are cats and cobras, which pop up out of nowhere. As defense, he has bombs which can be laid and detonated, rocks on top of the house to drop, and trap-doors. In between levels, the game has a bonus round in the form of a virtual slot machine, in which the player needs to get identical picture patterns to get as many points as possible, ranging from 200 to 1500 points.

References

External links

1982 video games
Arcade video games
Arcade-only video games
North America-exclusive video games
Platform games
Video games about mice and rats
Taito arcade games
Video games developed in Japan